Academy of Music may refer to:
In America
 Academy of Music (Baltimore), Maryland
 Academy of Music, a defunct theater in Charleston, South Carolina; see Academy of Music/Riviera Theatre
 Academy of Music (New York City) in Manhattan
 A second Academy of Music in Manhattan, renamed the Palladium
 Academy of Music (Philadelphia), Pennsylvania
 Academy of Music (Lynchburg, Virginia)
 Academy of Music Theatre, Northampton, Massachusetts
 Boston Academy of Music, Massachusetts
 Brooklyn Academy of Music in New York City

Elsewhere, other uses
 Academy of Music, Adelaide, Australia
 Academy of Music in Budapest, Hungary
 Academy of Music in Kraków, Poland
 Academy of Music (Ljubljana), Slovenia
 Academy of Music, Melbourne, Australia
 Baku Academy of Music, Azerbaijan
 London Academy of Music and Dramatic Art at the University of Kent
 Royal Academy of Music in London, England
 Royal Academy of Music (company) by G. F. Handel
 Royal Irish Academy of Music, a college within Dublin City University, Ireland
 Royal Scottish Academy of Music and Drama in Glasgow, Scotland
 Royal Swedish Academy of Music in Sweden
 Sarajevo Music Academy in Bosnia and Herzegovina
 Janáček Academy of Music and Performing Arts in Brno, Czech Republic
 Academy of Music, University of Zagreb, Croatia

See also
 Academy of Ancient Music in Cambridge, England